Eastern Air Lines Flight 537, registration N88727, was a Douglas DC-4 aircraft en route from Boston, Massachusetts, to Washington, D.C., via intermediate points on November 1, 1949. NX-26927 was a Lockheed P-38 Lightning being test-flown for acceptance by the government of Bolivia by Erick Rios Bridoux of the Bolivian Air Force. The two aircraft collided in mid-air at an altitude of 300 feet about half a mile southwest of the threshold of Runway 3 at Washington National Airport, killing all 55 aboard the DC-4 and seriously injuring the pilot of the P-38. At the time it was the deadliest airliner incident in United States history.

The tower controllers on duty that day at National testified that the P-38 had taken off on Runway 3, turned left north of the Pentagon, circled over Arlington, then returned, requesting permission to land due to engine trouble. The controller cleared the aircraft to join the left traffic pattern, but instead it flew south of the airport and entered a long straight-in approach at the same time Flight 537 was turning onto a shorter final. The controller then called Flight 537 ordering it to turn left; it began the turn, but by then the P-38, being considerably faster than a DC-4 on final, overtook the aircraft a half mile southwest of the threshold of Runway 3.

The DC-4 was cut in half by the left propeller of the P-38 just forward of the trailing edge of the wing. The aft portion of the DC-4 fell to the ground on the west bank of the Potomac River; other pieces were located in Alexandria, Virginia, at the Richmond, Fredericksburg & Potomac Railroad Potomac Yard and on a highway passing near the Yard. The fore portion of the aircraft fell into the river, as did the P-38.

Air Force Sergeant Morris J. Flounlacker hauled the weakly treading Bridoux out of the Potomac, just as the wounded pilot lost consciousness. At Alexandria Hospital, doctors found he had a broken back, crushed ribs and serious contusions.

Bridoux contradicted much of the tower controllers' testimony when he spoke to Civil Aeronautics Board (CAB) investigators. He claimed he had taken off from Runway 36, had been in constant contact with the tower, and had been explicitly cleared to land on Runway 3 under the call sign "Bolivian 927". However, the testimony of both the tower personnel and a military controller listening in on the frequency from his position at Bolling Air Force Base (as well as other discrepancies in the P-38 pilot's testimony) led the CAB to discount Bridoux's version of events. As Bridoux spoke and understood English well, it was thought that language difficulties played no part in the accident.

The CAB determined the primary probable causes of the accident to be the P-38 pilot's decision to land without proper clearance and his failure to exercise normal vigilance in looking out for conflicting traffic. The CAB also found that the tower controllers failed to exercise due vigilance in not notifying the pilots of Flight 537 earlier as to the critical traffic situation developing. However, the report also states that even if Flight 537 had received earlier advice with respect to the P-38's location, it might still have been too late to avoid the accident, as Bridoux's actions left Flight 537 only a few seconds in which to turn.

Among the dead on Flight 537 were Congressman George J. Bates, New Yorker cartoonist Helen E. Hokinson, and former Congressman Michael J. Kennedy.

See also
List of sole survivors of aviation accidents and incidents

References

External links
 Haine, Edgar (2000), Disaster in the Air, pp. 233–240. Retrieved August 25, 2009, using Google Book Search
 Erick Rios Bridoux v. Eastern Air Lines, United States Court of Appeals District of Columbia Circuit, 1954
 The Deseret News, November 1 1949, p. 1. Retrieved August 25, 2009 – includes photographs of crash wreckage
 The Deseret News, November 1 1949, p. 5. Retrieved August 25, 2009 – names of those on board the DC-4
 Reaction of Eleanor Roosevelt to the disaster, November 5, 1949.  Retrieved August 25, 2009
Planes Collide Near National Airport Killing 55; D.C. Loses Home Rule Advocate

1949 in Washington, D.C.
1949 in Virginia
Accidents and incidents involving the Douglas DC-4
Airliner accidents and incidents in Washington, D.C.
Aviation accidents and incidents in the United States in 1949
Airliner accidents and incidents caused by pilot error
537
Mid-air collisions
Mid-air collisions involving airliners
Mid-air collisions involving military aircraft
November 1949 events in the United States
Ronald Reagan Washington National Airport